Anastasia Myskina was the defending champion, but lost in first round to Justine Henin.

Henrieta Nagyová won the title by defeating Pavlina Nola 6–3, 7–5 in the final.

Seeds

Draw

Finals

Top half

Bottom half

References

External links
 Official results archive (ITF)
 Official results archive (WTA)

Internazionali Femminili di Palermo - Singles
2000 Singles